

Box office

List of films

References

External links 
 Punjabi films at the Internet Movie Database

2017
Punjabi
2010s Punjabi-language films